Odell is an English surname originating in Odell, Bedfordshire. In some families the surname is spelled O'Dell, in a mistaken Irish adaptation. 

The name derived from Woad Hill. 

Notable people with the surname include:

Amy Odell, British singer-songwriter
Benjamin Odell (producer) (born 1969), American film producer
Benjamin Barker Odell, Jr. (1854–1926), American politician and governor
Bob Odell (American football) (born 1922), American football player
Bob Odell (politician) (born 1943), American politician
Cary Odell (1910–1988), American art director
David Odell, American screenwriter and film director
Deborah Odell (born 1973), Canadian actress
Dianne Odell (1947–2008), American poliomyelitis patient
Edward Odell (1947–2013), American mathematician
Helen Odell (1922-2012), American artist
Horace Odell (1910–1984), American javelin thrower
Howard Odell (1910–2000), American football player and coach
Jack Odell (1920–2007), English toy inventor
Jonas Odell (born 1962), Swedish director
Jonathan Odell (1737–1818), American poet
Mary Jane Odell (1923-2010), American politician
Mats Odell (born 1947), Swedish politician
Matthew Odell (born 1979), American pianist
Maude Odell (1871–1937), American actress
Moses F. Odell (1818–1866), American politician
N. Holmes Odell (1828–1904), American politician
Noel Odell (1890–1987), English geologist and mountaineer
Robert Odell (1896–1984), American art director
Tom Odell (born 1990), British singer-songwriter
Thomas Odell (writer) (1691–1749), English playwright
Wally Odell (1912–1971), English footballer
William Odell (cricketer) (1881–1917), English cricketer
William Hunter Odell (1811–1891), Canadian lawyer, judge, and politician

See also
Odell (given name)
O'Dell, surname

English-language surnames